AssureSign (now Nintex AssureSign) provides electronic signature and digital transaction management (DTM) software that can be deployed as a  Software as a service (SaaS) application or installed on customer premises. Documents are signed using a computer that has an Internet connection.

AssureSign electronic signature technology uses patent-pending biometric, handwritten, mouse-based signatures.

AssureSign's tools enable users to integrate with existing environments. AssureSign maintains a partner program. AssureSign has also been integrated with other third party applications.

AssureSign Electronic Signature Technology was developed in 2006 as an offering by Third Party Verification, Inc. (3PV). AssureSign LLC was formed as a separate company in 2008 by David Brinkman and Dale Combs. AssureSign and 3PV are consistently ranked on Orlando Sentinel's Top 100 Companies for Working Families.

In July 2021, AssureSign was purchased by Nintex.

References 

Computer security software
Electronic signature providers